Charles Jackson was an 18th-century Anglican bishop in Ireland.

He was consecrated Bishop of Ferns and Leighlin on 19 April 1761 and translated to Kildare in 1765. As Bishop of Kildare he was also simultaneously Dean of Christ Church Cathedral, Dublin as the two posts were held in commendam. A member of the Royal Dublin Society, he died on 29 March 1790.

References

Year of birth unknown
1790 deaths
Deans of Christ Church Cathedral, Dublin
Bishops of Ferns and Leighlin
Anglican bishops of Kildare